Culicoides paraensis is a species of midge found from the northern United States to Argentina, which acts as the vector of the Oropouche fever virus.

References

paraensis
Diptera of North America
Diptera of South America
Insects described in 1905